Guinea competed at the 2019 African Games held from 19 to 31 August 2019 in Rabat, Morocco. In total, two bronze medals were won and the country finished in 38th place in the medal table, shared with Benin and Togo.

Medal summary

Medal table 

|  style="text-align:left; width:78%; vertical-align:top;"|

Archery 

Mohamed Diao and Fatoumata Sylla represented Guinea in archery. Diao competed in the men's individual recurve event and Sylla competed in the women's individual recurve event. Together they competed in the mixed team recurve event.

Athletics 

Three athletes represented Guinea in athletics.

Aboubabacar Barry competed in the men's 100 metres event and he finished in 45th place.

Barry and Cheick Aboubacar Camara also competed in the men's 200 metres event and they finished in 41st and 46th place respectively.

Makoura Keita competed in the women's 100 metres event and she finished in 39th place in the heats.

Badminton 

Amadou Bah competed in the men's singles event and Kadiatou Balde competed in the women's singles event. They were both eliminated in the first round.

Boxing 

Mamadou Keita (men's 52 kg) and Alseny Sylla (men's 63 kg) competed in boxing.

Cycling 

Abdoulaye Bangoura and Ibrahima Sory Sylla represented Guinea in cycling. They both competed in the men's individual time trial (road cycling) and the men's road race.

Handball 

Both Guinea's national handball team and women's national handball team competed in handball at the 2019 African Games.

In the men's tournament the team finished in 7th place and in the women's tournament the team finished in 4th place.

Judo 

Two athletes were registered to compete in their events but they did not compete in their events.

Swimming 

Mamadou Tahirou Bah and Mariama Lamarana Toure represented Guinea in swimming.

Bah competed in the men's 50 metre freestyle and men's 100 metre freestyle events.

Toure competed in the women's 50 metre breaststroke and the women's 50 metre freestyle events.

Table tennis 

Guinea competed in table tennis.

Maret Camara competed in the men's singles event. He won his first match against El Moctar Ahmed Salem and lost his next match against Idowu Saheed.

Fatou Bangoura competed in the women's singles event. She lost her only match against Mazombo Sabrina Roseline.

Taekwondo 

Two athletes competed in Taekwondo.

Tennis 

Alpha Diallo and Mamadouba Makadji competed in tennis in the men's singles event. Both were eliminated in their first match.

Wrestling 

Three athletes represented Guinea in wrestling.

Men's freestyle

Women's freestyle

References 

Nations at the 2019 African Games
2019
African Games